John Lee "Johnny" Baldwin (born August 26, 1949 in Detroit) is an American boxer who competed in the Light Middleweight (71 kg) category. He won an Olympic bronze medal in 1968.

Pro career
Known as "The Mad" Baldwin, he turned pro in 1970 and lost a decision to Marvin Hagler in 1975.  In 1977 he took on Rocky Mosley Jr in the ill-fated U.S. Championship Tournament, but lost via K.O.  In 1978 he lost a decision to Marvin Johnson, and retired a year later.

Professional boxing record

References

External links
 
 

1949 births
Living people
Boxers from Detroit
Boxers at the 1968 Summer Olympics
Olympic bronze medalists for the United States in boxing
American male boxers
Medalists at the 1968 Summer Olympics
Light-middleweight boxers